Travon Garrett Bellamy (born January 11, 1988) is a former American football cornerback. He was signed by the St. Louis Rams as an undrafted free agent in 2011. He played college football for the University of Illinois.

He was also a member of the Chicago Rush and Washington Redskins.

Early years
Bellamy attended Eleanor Roosevelt High School in Greenbelt, Maryland, where he played football. He graduated from Eleanor Roosevelt in 2006.

College career
Bellamy attended the University of Illinois. He played cornerback for the Illinois from 2006 to 2010. In his senior year, Bellamy started 12 of 13 games. During the 2010 season, he recorded 70 tackles, third-most on the team, and six pass breakups.

Professional career

St. Louis Rams
On July 30, 2011, Bellamy signed with the St. Louis Rams as an undrafted free agent.
The Rams waived Bellamy on August 3, 2011.

Chicago Rush
Bellamy was assigned to the Chicago Rush on October 5, 2011. He was exempted by the Rush on December 1, 2011.

Washington Redskins
On November 29, 2011, Bellamy was signed to the practice squad of the Washington Redskins.

On January 3, 2012, Bellamy signed a futures contract with the Redskins. He was released on August 31, 2012 for final cuts before the start of the 2012 season.

Personal
Bellamy is a cousin of ESPN PTI personality and longtime Washington Post sports columnist, Michael Wilbon.

References

External links
Illinois Fighting Illini bio

1988 births
Living people
American football cornerbacks
Illinois Fighting Illini football players
St. Louis Rams players
Chicago Rush players
Washington Redskins players
Players of American football from Washington, D.C.